In mathematics, the Thurston boundary of Teichmüller space of a surface is obtained as the boundary of its closure in the projective space of functionals on simple closed curves on the surface. The Thurston boundary can be interpreted as the space of projective measured foliations on the surface.

The Thurston boundary of the Teichmüller space of a closed surface of genus  is homeomorphic to a sphere of dimension . The action of the mapping class group on the Teichmüller space extends continuously over the union with the boundary.

Measured foliations on surfaces 

Let  be a closed surface. The foliation and the measure must be compatible in the sense that the measure is invariant if the arc is deformed with endpoints staying in the same leaf.

A measured foliation  can be used to define a function  as follows: if  is any curve let

Then if  the intersection number is defined by:
.
The space  of projective measured laminations is the image of the set of measured laminations in the projective space  via the embedding .

Compactification of Teichmüller space

Embedding in the space of functionals 

Let  be a closed surface. Recall that a point in the Teichmüller space is a pair  where  is a hyperbolic surface (a Riemannian manifold with sectional curvatures all equal to ) and  a homeomorphism, up to a natural equivalence relation. The map  is an embedding of  into , which can be used to give the Teichmüller space a topology (the right-hand side being given the product topology).

In fact, the map to the projective space  is still an embedding: let  denote the image of  there. Since this space is compact, the closure  is compact: it is called the Thurston compactification of the Teichmüller space.

The Thurston boundary 

The proof also implies that the Thurston compactfification is homeomorphic to the -dimensional closed ball.

Applications

Pseudo-Anosov diffeomorphisms 

Using his compactification Thurston proved the following characterisation of pseudo-Anosov mapping classes (i.e. mapping classes which contain a pseudo-Anosov element), which was in essence known to Nielsen and is usually called the Nielsen-Thurston classification. A mapping class  is pseudo-Anosov if and only if:
it is not reducible (i.e. there is no  and  such that );
it is not of finite order (i.e. there is no  such that  is the isotopy class of the identity).
If the fixed point is in the interior then the class is of finite order; if it is on the boundary and the underlying foliation has a closed leaf then it is reducible; in the remaining case it is possible to show that there is another fixed point corresponding to a transverse measured foliation, and to deduce the pseudo-Anosov property.

Applications to the mapping class group 

The action of the mapping class group of the surface  on the Teichmüller space extends continuously to the Thurston compactification. This provides a powerful tool to study the structure of this group; for example it is used in the proof of the Tits alternative for the mapping class group. It can also be used to prove various results about the subgroup structure of the mapping class group.

Applications to 3–manifolds 

The compactification of Teichmüller space by adding measured foliations is essential in the definition of the ending laminations of a hyperbolic 3-manifold.

Actions on real trees 

A point in Teichmüller space  can alternatively be seen as a faithful representation of the fundamental group  into the isometry group  of the hyperbolic plane , up to conjugation. Two such action are equivariantly isometric if and only if they come from the same point in Teichmüller space. The space of such actions (endowed with a natural topology) is compact, and hence we get another compactification of Teichmüller space. A theorem of R. Skora states that this compactification is equivariantly homeomorphic the Thurston compactification.

Notes

References 

Geometric topology
Geometric group theory